Adam Hanuszkiewicz (16 June 1924 – 4 December 2011) was a Polish actor and theatre director.

Hanuszkiewicz was born in Lwów, Poland.  He died in Warsaw, aged 87.

References

External links

 
 Adam Hanuszkiewicz at culture.pl

1924 births
2011 deaths
Actors from Lviv
Polish theatre directors
Officers Crosses of the Order of Merit of the Federal Republic of Germany
Recipients of the Order of the Banner of Work
20th-century Polish male actors
Commanders with Star of the Order of Polonia Restituta
Recipients of the Gold Cross of Merit (Poland)
Recipients of the Gold Medal for Merit to Culture – Gloria Artis
Polish male stage actors
Commander's Crosses of the Order for Merits to Lithuania
Commanders of the Order of Polonia Restituta
Recipients of the State Award Badge (Poland)
Recipient of the Meritorious Activist of Culture badge